The 1st African Cross Country Championships was an international cross country running competition for African athletes which was held on 6 March 2011 in Cape Town, South Africa. Organised by the Confederation of African Athletics, it marked the start of a new continental competition for Africa following the decision by the IAAF to alter the scheduling of the World Cross Country Championships from every year to a biennial format.

The event consisted of four race categories, featuring senior and junior races for men and women. The Kenyan athletes took a complete sweep of the competition, winning all the individual medals and the four team titles. Mercy Cherono, a former World Junior Champion, took the women's senior title while the less well-known John Mwangangi won the men's senior race. Japhet Korir and Caroline Chepkoech won the men's and women's junior gold medals, respectively. Sigosi Chesonane, representing the host nation, was the only non-Kenyan to reach the top five in an event, finishing fifth in the men's senior race.

Although Kenya dominated the competition, none of its runners at the African event ran at the 2011 IAAF World Cross Country Championships two weeks later. Athletics Kenya sent the best performers at that year's Kenya Cross Country Championships to the world event, while those ranking seventh to tenth in the national race were sent to the event in Cape Town. The continent's second foremost nation in cross country, Ethiopia, did not send any athletes to the competition.

The Kenyan team's jubilant celebrations led to the entire squad of 30 runners and officials missing their flight for Nairobi, scheduled later that day at Cape Town International Airport.

Medallists

Individual

Participation

References

Results
Senior men
Senior women
Junior men
Junior women

African Cross Country
African Cross Country Championships
International athletics competitions hosted by South Africa
2011 in South African sport
African cross Country
Sports competitions in Cape Town
Cross country running in South Africa
March 1994 sports events in Africa
2010s in Cape Town
